Circumvesuviana is a railway network in the east of the Naples metropolitan area, previously run by a company of the same name, now operated by Ente Autonomo Volturno. It is entirely separate from other national and regional railway lines.

The Circumvesuviana railway covers a wide catchment area of over 2 million people, distributed in 47 municipalities, including Scafati, San Valentino Torio and Sarno in the province of Salerno and Avella and Baiano in the province of Avellino. The network forms an important commercial artery, and provides services to the tourist destinations of Pompeii and Herculaneum.

All routes start from the Napoli Porta Nolana terminus near the Porta Nolana, and pass through Napoli Garibaldi station before splitting into several branches to towns in the province.

On 27 December 2012 the original company was absorbed by the Ente Autonomo Volturno. Prior to the COVID-19 pandemic, the network was used by 25 million passengers annually.

Lines
All lines are powered by electric overhead lines.

Rolling stock
The network uses two types of rolling stock, both electrically powered: FE220 units, T21 and "Metrostar" articulated trains.

The FE220 cars are usually coupled together to form a two- or three-car multiple units, painted white with red doors and ends. The FE220 trains come in two different variations. 

Twenty-six ETR211 "Metrostar" three-car articulated units were introduced between November 2008 and September 2009. Manufactured by a consortium of Firema and AnsaldoBreda, these trains are capable of carrying 450 passengers and are styled by Pininfarina. As well as being more powerful than the FE220 units, they have computer driving aids, self-levelling suspension. 
These units are mostly used to provide the express service whilst the FE220 provide cheaper, stopping services which tend to be far more crowded.

Notes

See also 
 Metropolitana di Napoli
 List of suburban and commuter rail systems

External links
 Official Circumvesuviana site (In Italian, last updated 2002)
 Unofficial site (mostly in Italian with a summary in English)
Current schedules on the EAV site (In Italian, but schedules are numeric once you select a line)

Railway companies of Italy
Railway lines in Campania
Transport in Naples
950 mm gauge railways in Italy
Companies based in Campania
Mount Vesuvius